Jesse McGuire (born August 29, 1958) is an American trumpeter from Phoenix, Arizona, famous for his execution of the Star Spangled Banner, which he has performed for three U.S. presidents, and at many major sporting events, most notably the 2000 Daytona 500, Duralube 500 at Phoenix International Raceway 2001, game 7 of the 2001 World Series, the 2010 NBA Playoffs game between the Los Angeles Lakers and the Phoenix Suns, a January 30, 2012 game between the Dallas Mavericks and the Phoenix Suns, the 2014 NFL Playoff game between the Panthers and the 49ers, and the 2018 Philadelphia Eagles Super Bowl Parade.

McGuire was lead trumpeter for the Lincoln Center Jazz Orchestra of New York City and for the band Tower of Power. He toured worldwide with many acts including Tower of Power and Wynton Marsalis.

References

External links
 Official web site
 Jesse McGuire – Bio – Tower of Power Fan Site 
 Jesse McGuire – Tower of Power Fan Site – National Anthem Performance

1958 births
Living people
American jazz trumpeters
American male trumpeters
Tower of Power members
21st-century trumpeters
21st-century American male musicians
American male jazz musicians
African-American musicians
African-American jazz musicians